Maria Iandolo New is a professor of Pediatrics, Genomics and Genetics at Icahn School of Medicine at Mount Sinai in New York City. She is an expert in congenital adrenal hyperplasia (CAH), a genetic condition affecting the adrenal gland that can affect sexual development.

Medical education

New received her undergraduate degree from Cornell University in Ithaca, New York, in 1950, and her M. D. from the Perelman School of Medicine at the University of Pennsylvania in Philadelphia, in 1954. She completed an internship in medicine at Bellevue Hospital in New York, followed by a residency in pediatrics at the New York Hospital. From 1957 to 1958 she studied renal functioning under a fellowship from the National Institutes of Health (NIH). She was a research pediatrician to the Diabetic Study Group of the Comprehensive Care Teaching Program at the New York Hospital-Cornell Medical Center from 1958 to 1961, and had a second NIH fellowship under Ralph E. Peterson from 1961 to 1964, to study specific steroid hormone production during infancy, childhood and adolescence.

Career

In 1964, New was appointed Chief of Pediatric Endocrinology at Cornell University Medical College, a position she held for 40 years. In 1978, she was named Harold and Percy Uris Professor of Pediatric Endocrinology and Metabolism. In 1980, New was appointed Chairman of the Department of Pediatrics at Cornell University Medical College and Pediatrician-in-Chief of the Department of Pediatrics at New York-Presbyterian Hospital. She was one of the few women in the country to serve as Chair of a major division of a medical college, and her tenure lasted for 22 years. While Chairman, New founded and directed the 8-bed Children's Clinical Research Center, a clinical research center in pediatrics with groundbreaking research in pediatric endocrinology, hematology, and immunology, during the emergence of AIDS. In 2004, New was recruited to the Mount Sinai School of Medicine as Professor of Pediatrics and Human Genetics and Director of the Adrenal Steroid Disorders Program. She is also currently Adjunct Professor of Genetics at Columbia College of Physicians and Surgeons, and Associate Dean for Research at the Herbert Wertheim College of Medicine at Florida International University.

New is recognized as one of the world's leading pediatric endocrinologists. Her career links clinical and basic science. She has continued her scientific research, including the use of molecular genetic diagnosis, prenatal diagnosis and treatment. Although steroid physiology was well understood when New began her scientific career, little of the knowledge had been applied to the understanding of steroid disorders in children. New's research on the mechanism and genetics of steroid disorders has established standards for pre- and post-natal care for patients with congenital adrenal hyperplasia and apparent mineralocorticoid excess.

During a 43-year period, New held the longest continuously funded National Institutes of Health grant, "Androgen Metabolism in Childhood", which supported research characterizing the diverse clinical spectra of patients with rare steroidogenic enzyme defects, such as congenital adrenal hyperplasia, and their metabolic consequences.

Her current primary research emphasis is on genetic steroid disorders. New continues to study three monogenic disorders: 21-hydroxylase deficiency, 11β-hydroxylase deficiency, and apparent mineralocorticoid excess, emphasizing genotype/phenotype correlation and prenatal diagnosis and treatment. She has published more than 640 academic articles in a wide range of prestigious journals and published a genetics book entitled Genetic Steroid Disorders in 2014.  She has also received numerous awards recognizing her work treating mothers and children affected with the disorder.

Principal discoveries

In 1977, New first described apparent mineralocorticoid excess (AME) in a Zuni girl. Her team was the first to publish mutations on the 11β-hydroxysteroid dehydrogenase type 2 enzyme (encoded by the HSD11B2 gene) causing this potentially fatal form of low renin hypertension. New opened a new field of receptor biology by demonstrating the action of the 11β-HSD2 enzyme at the mineralocorticoid receptor of the distal renal tubule to metabolize cortisol to cortisone and thus protect the receptor. This was the first demonstration of the metabolism of a ligand to down-regulate its action on receptor activation.

In 1979, New described a form of mild steroid 21-hydroxylase deficiency called nonclassical 21-hydroxylase deficiency, which is characterized by diverse hyperandrogenic symptoms appearing postnatally in males and females. The remarkable prevalence of 1 in 27 Ashkenazi Jews of a mild form of CAH was documented by New in 1985 and the genetic frequency of the mutation is 1 in 3 in the Ashkenazi Jewish population. These studies established nonclassical 21-hydroxylase deficiency as the most frequent disorder of all autosomal recessive diseases in humans. While a spectrum of severity of congenital adrenal hyperplasia had always been observed, New was first to identify the mild form with specific molecular mutations.

Awards and honors

New has received numerous honors, including:

 IPSEN Award (2014) for her "outstanding work" in pediatric endocrinology and her "fundamental advances"
 Ceppellini Prize, the Highest Award in Italy for Genetics (2010)
 Judson J. Van Wyk Prize, Lawson Wilkins Pediatric Endocrine Society (2010) 
 Fred Conrad Koch Award, The Endocrine Society (2003), the highest prize from the American Endocrine Society 
 General Clinical Research Centers Program Eleventh Annual Award for Excellence in Clinical Research (1999)
 MERIT Award, National Institute of Child Health and Human Development (1998) 
 Rhône-Poulenc Rorer Clinical Investigator Award, The Endocrine Society (1995) 
 Dale Medal, Society for Endocrinology (1995) 
 Robert H. Williams Distinguished Leadership Award, The Endocrine Society (1988), the highest award from the British Endocrine Society 
 Recipient, Barnard Centennial Award: "100 Outstanding New York Women"
 University of Pennsylvania Distinguished Graduate Award 
 Program Director of Pediatric Endocrine Training Program, ACGME
 St. Geme Lectureship, University of Colorado School of Medicine (2010) 
 President, The Endocrine Society (1992)
 President, Lawson Wilkins Pediatric Endocrine Society (1985) 
 Honorary Member, Society for Endocrinology (2005)
 Honorary Member, Italian Endocrine Society
 Member, President's Council of Cornell Women
 Alpha Omega Alpha, University of Pennsylvania School of Medicine
 New York Practitioner's Society, the oldest medical society in the USA (mostly Nobel laureates and members of the National Academy of Sciences)
 Honorary Degree, Turin School of Medicine
 Honorary Degree in Medicine (Laurea Honoris Causa), Università degli Studi di Roma

New is an active member of the New York State Public Health Council, the Public Healthy Policy Advisory Board, the National Advisory Research and Resources Council of the National Institute of Child Health and Human Development, the National Advisory Committee for the Robert Wood Johnson Minority Medical Faculty Development Program, the Task Force on Childhood Violence, and the Leading Edge Endowment Fund of British Columbia. She also serves as a consultant for the New York State Newborn Screening Program and for the Food and Drug Administration's Endocrine and Metabolic Drug Advisory Committee, was the President of the Endocrine Society in 1992, was Editor-In-Chief of The Journal of Clinical Endocrinology and Metabolism for over six years. In 2006, she was awarded the Allan Munck Prize by Dartmouth Medical School. New was elected to the Hall of Honor of the NIH, received a Merit Award, and served as editor for over 15 leading medicals journals and textbooks. New has received two grants from the Genesis Foundation of New York to study Jewish genetic disorders. As an Italo-American, New was elected to the Italian Endocrine Society.

In 1996, New was elected to the National Academy of Sciences, one of only two pediatricians to be members of the Academy.

Criticisms
Ethical issues have been raised about New's research. Namely, it has been questioned whether pregnant women undergoing treatment for the possible effects of congenital adrenal hyperplasia on their unborn babies were properly informed concerning the treatments that were administrated to them. In September 2010 the FDA found nothing worth pursuing.  In a 2012 article Alice Dreger followed up on the issues involved. Further research and long term studies are needed to establish the correct usage guideline.

References

American geneticists
Cornell University alumni
Cornell University faculty
Perelman School of Medicine at the University of Pennsylvania alumni
Intersex and medicine
American pediatric endocrinologists
American women geneticists
Women endocrinologists
20th-century American scientists
20th-century American women scientists
21st-century American scientists
21st-century American women scientists
Florida International University faculty
American women academics
Members of the National Academy of Medicine